Dr. M. is a 1990 crime film co-written and directed by Claude Chabrol. The film is loosely based on the plot of Fritz Lang's Dr. Mabuse the Gambler, which was in turn based on Mabuse der Spieler by Norbert Jacques.

Plot

In the near future, there is an outbreak of dramatic suicides in Berlin. A police detective suspects that the suicides are really caused by a lone madman, Dr. Marsfeldt, who is using a form of mass hypnosis. His investigations lead him to a beautiful, enigmatic woman whose image is being used to manipulate the populace.

Cast

Critical reception

Steve Simels of Entertainment Weekly gave the film a C−:

Jackson Adler of TV Guide gave the film 3 out of 4 stars:

Release

Home media

The film was released in the United States as Club Extinction on VHS.

See also
 Dr. Mabuse the Gambler

References

External links 
 
 
 

1990 films
1990s psychological thriller films
1990s science fiction thriller films
Dr. Mabuse films
Dystopian films
Remakes of German films
Films about viral outbreaks
Films based on works by Thea von Harbou
Films directed by Claude Chabrol
Films set in 1999
Films set in Berlin
Films shot in Germany
French science fiction films
French psychological thriller films
Italian science fiction thriller films
Italian psychological thriller films
West German films
German science fiction films
German psychological thriller films
Police detective films
Italian post-apocalyptic films
Films set in the future
English-language French films
English-language German films
English-language Italian films
French post-apocalyptic films
German post-apocalyptic films
1990s English-language films
1990s French films
1990s German films